Tiarodes is a genus of assassin bugs. Eighty-five species are known.

Partial list of species
Tiarodes acutangulus Miller, 1959
Tiarodes ambulator Miller, 1959
Tiarodes obyanus Distant, 1902
Tiarodes pictus Cai & Tomokuni, 2001
Tiarodes rufithorax Reuter, 1881
Tiarodes salvazai Miller, 1959
Tiarodes varicolor Stål, 1863
Tiarodes venenatus Cai & Sun, 2001
Tiarodes versicolor (Laporte, 1833)
Tiarodes vexillarius Miller, 1959
Tiarodes vilis Miller, 1959
Tiarodes vorax Miller, 1940
Tiarodes waterstradti Breddin, 1903
Tiarodes xantusi Reuter, 1881

References

Reduviidae
Taxa named by Hermann Burmeister